Lee Hunter may refer to:

 Lee Hunter (Hollyoaks), a fictional character from the British soap opera Hollyoaks
 Lee Hunter (engineer) (1913–1986), automotive engineer
 Lee Hunter (footballer) (born 1974), English footballer
 Lee Hunter (American Football Player),  High School American Football player, Auburn recruit to play in 2021